The discography of British singer-songwriter Billy Bragg includes 13 studio albums (including two with Wilco and one with The Blokes), six live albums, 12 compilation albums, five extended plays, and 20 singles.

Albums

Studio albums

Live albums

Compilation albums

Singles and EPs

As lead artist

As featured artist

Notes

References

External links
The Official Billy Bragg website

Discography
Rock music discographies
Discographies of British artists
Folk music discographies